Athletics is one of the sports at the biennial Games of the Small States of Europe. Athletics competitions have been held at every edition of the games since 1985 and is one of the eight core sports of the games.

Editions

See also
List of Games of the Small States of Europe records in athletics

References

Medalists
Games of the Small States of Europe. GBR Athletics. Retrieved 2020-02-15.

 
Games of the Small States of Europe
Athletics
Games of the Small States of Europe